Fauces may refer to:

 Fauces (throat), the opening at the back of the mouth
 Fauces (architecture), narrow passageways